UroVysion is a fluorescence in situ hybridization assay that was developed for the detection of bladder cancer in urine specimens. It consists of fluorescently labeled DNA probes to the pericentromeric regions of chromosomes 3 (red), 7 (green), and 17 (aqua) and to the 9p21 band (gold) location of the P16 tumor suppressor gene.

References

External links
 Abbott Moledular: UroVysion Bladder Cancer Kit For In Vitro Diagnostic Use

Cytogenetics
Gene tests